The history of fire brigades in the United Kingdom charts the development of fire services in the United Kingdom from the creation of the United Kingdom to the present day.

19th century

Between the 17th century and the beginning of the 19th century, all fire engines and crews in the United Kingdom were either provided by voluntary bodies, parish authorities or insurance companies. James Braidwood founded the world's first municipal fire service in Edinburgh after the Great Fire of Edinburgh in 1824 destroyed much of the city's Old Town. Braidwood later went on to become superintendent of the London Fire Engine Establishment (LFEE), which brought together ten independent insurance company brigades in 1833.  A  bronze statue of Braidwood, located in Parliament Square in Edinburgh, commemorates his achievements. The Royal Society for the Protection of Life from Fire was formed in 1836 mainly to provide mobile escape ladders; protection of life was not the main concern of the insurance company brigades. Today it exists to give "recognition to individuals who perform acts of bravery in rescuing others from fire".

James Braidwood was killed at the Tooley Street fire of 1861, where a wall collapsed on top of him. This fire was a major factor in the decision of the British government, after much lobbying by liability-laden insurance companies and LFEE, to create the Metropolitan Fire Brigade in 1866. The MFB would be publicly funded and controlled through the Metropolitan Board of Works. Its first superintendent was Captain Sir Eyre Massey Shaw. In 1904, the MFB changed its name to the London Fire Brigade.

Outside London, new local government bodies created by late 19th century legislation (such as the Local Government Act 1894) took over responsibility for fire-fighting.

20th century

Before 1938, there were some 1,600 local fire brigades in operation. The Fire Brigades Act 1938 constituted the councils of all county boroughs and county districts (municipal boroughs, urban and rural districts) as fire authorities. The councils were required to provide the services for their borough or district of such a fire brigade and of such fire engines, appliances and equipment as may be necessary to meet efficiently all normal requirements. At roughly the same time, the Auxiliary Fire Service, consisting largely of unpaid volunteers, was formed in parallel to the Air Raid Precautions organisation. Every borough and urban district had an AFS unit, and they operated their own fire stations in parallel to the local authority. Members of the AFS could be called up for full-time paid service if necessary, a similar arrangement applied to the wartime Special Constabulary.

The effects of the 1938 Act were short lived (though it was not repealed until 1947), as all local brigades and Auxiliary Fire Service units in Great Britain were merged into the National Fire Service in 1941, which was itself under the auspices of the Civil Defence Service. There was a separate National Fire Service (Northern Ireland).  Before the war, there had been little or no standardisation of equipment, most importantly in the diameter of hydrant valves. This made regional integration difficult.

The 1938 Act was replaced by the Fire Services Act 1947, which disbanded the National Fire Service and made firefighting functions the responsibility of county and county borough councils, meaning there were still far fewer brigades than before the war. There were also slightly different arrangements in Scotland from England and Wales. The Auxiliary Fire Service was reformed in 1948 as a national fire reserve, and operated the famous Green Goddess "self-propelled pumps", tasked with relaying vast quantities of water into burning cities after a nuclear attack, and also with supporting local fire services.

Local government was completely reorganised in the mid 1970s (see Local Government Act 1972 and Local Government (Scotland) Act 1973), meaning many fire brigades were merged and renamed. There have been some other amalgamations since then, including the 2013 merger of all Scottish services into one, the Scottish Fire and Rescue Service.

Before 1974, all but one of the fire brigades in England and Wales used the term "Fire Brigade", the exception was the City of Salford, which called itself "Fire Department". After 1974, all but two of the new authorities adopted the term "Fire Service", the two exceptions being Avon County and County Cleveland. Most of the older county brigades who came through the reorganisation with little change also changed their names to "Fire Service", the only brigades not to adopt the term were London, Cornwall, East Sussex, Somerset, West Sussex and Wiltshire, all of which still retained the name "Fire Brigade". More recently, almost all fire authorities have changed their name to "Fire and Rescue Service", the only exceptions to this are, Cleveland and London who still use "Fire Brigade" and West Midlands Fire Service.

Fire brigades in England

19481974
The following is a list of all the fire brigades created by the 1947 decentralisation, and also those created by mergers in the 1960s, up until local government reorganisation in 1974.

1974 onwards
From 1974, each of the new county councils and the Greater London Council (GLC) maintained a separate fire brigade. In 1986, the GLC and the six metropolitan county councils were abolished. This led to the establishment of fire and civil defence authorities which were joint boards of London and metropolitan borough councils. Local government reform in the 1990s created a number of unitary authorities, usually termed as district or borough councils but sometimes also county councils, and accordingly combined fire authorities constituted in a number of counties.

Fire brigades in Wales

19481974

19741996
From 1974 each of the new county councils maintained a separate fire brigade.

1996 onwards
The Local Government (Wales) Act 1994 replaced the eight counties with unitary authorities. The authorities are grouped into three areas for the provision of fire and rescue services. Fire services are administered by fire and rescue authorities consisting of councillors from each of the councils in the area.

Fire brigades in Scotland

19481975
The first public fire service in the UK was founded in Edinburgh in 1824. Central government responsibility for fire brigades was handed to the Scottish Office and the Secretary of State for Scotland upon their creation in 1885. The 1947 Act also reorganised fire services in Scotland. Section 36 obliged county councils, corporations of counties of cities and town councils of large burghs to form combined fire brigades. Schedule 4 set the combined areas of the new brigades.

The County of the City of Glasgow continued to maintain its own fire brigade, so that there were 11 brigades in all.

19752013

The Local Government (Scotland) Act 1973 reorganised local government from 1975. County councils and town councils were abolished, making regional or islands area councils the new fire authorities, except where a combined fire authority was present. Some of the new administrative areas were grouped, and eight brigades were formed in all. Minor name changes took place throughout the life of these brigades; "Northern" was changed to "Highlands and Islands" in 1983, "Central Region" became "Central Scotland" when local government was again reformed in 1996, and all brigades except Tayside and the Highlands and Islands eventually adopted the name "Fire and Rescue Service".

Since 2013
Under the terms of the Police and Fire Reform (Scotland) Act 2012, the eight regional services were replaced by a single Scottish Fire and Rescue Service for the whole of Scotland, with effect from 1 April 2013. The Scottish Fire and Rescue Service has its headquarters in Cambuslang (having initially been based in Perth).

Fire brigades in Northern Ireland

As in Great Britain, there were numerous local authority fire brigades in Northern Ireland until the Second World War. On 1 March 1942 all brigades were nationalised by the Fire Services (Emergency Provisions) (NI) Act 1942 as the National Fire Service (Northern Ireland).

On 1 January 1948, the Fire Services Act (Northern Ireland) 1947 came into effect. This provided for the establishment of four brigades in the province:
Belfast Fire Brigade
Northern Fire Authority, based in Ballymena
Southern Fire Authority, based in Portadown
Western Fire Authority, based in Derry

Northern Ireland Fire Brigade 19502006
The three regional brigades were short-lived and on 1 January 1950 they were amalgamated into the Northern Ireland Fire Authority.

In 1973, the Belfast Fire Brigade and NIFA were amalgamated into a single Fire Authority for Northern Ireland.

Northern Ireland Fire and Rescue Service
On 1 July 2006, the fire authority was replaced with a Northern Ireland Fire and Rescue Service Board, with the brigade adopting the title Northern Ireland Fire and Rescue Service.

See also

Fire Service in the UK
Local Government Acts
Salvage Corps
Women in firefighting
History of law enforcement in the United Kingdom
Fire insurance mark

References

External links
Fire Service College: Official site

Fire and rescue in the United Kingdom
History of firefighting
Fire brigades
History of the United Kingdom by topic